Sheela Gowda (born 1957 in Bhadravati, India) is a contemporary artist living and working in Bangalore. Gowda studied painting at Ken School of Art, Bangalore, India (1979) pursued a postgraduate diploma at Visva-Bharati University, Santiniketan, India (1982), and a MA in painting from the Royal College of Art in London in 1986. Trained as a painter Gowda expanded her practice into sculpture and installation employing a diversity of material like human hair, cow-dung, incense and kumkuma powder (a natural pigment most often available in brilliant red). She is known for her 'process-orientated' work, often inspired by the everyday labor experiences of marginalized people in India.  Her work is associated with postminimalism drawing from ritualistic associations. Her early oils with pensive girls in nature were influenced by her mentor K. G. Subramanyan, and later ones by Nalini Malani towards a somewhat expressionistic direction depicting a middle class chaos and tensions underplayed by coarse eroticism. She is the recipient of the 2019 Maria Lassnig Prize.

Early life
Due to her father, she lived in both rural and urban areas. Her father documented folk music and collected folk objects. Gowda's art schooling began at Ken in Bangalore, a small college established by R. M. Hadapad. Later, she went to Baroda to study under Professor K. G. Subramanyan.

Work
Gowda moved into installation and sculpture in the 1990s in response to the changing political landscape in India. She had her first solo show at Iniva, London, entitled Therein and Besides in 2011. She was a finalist for the Hugo Boss Award in 2014. She creates apocalyptic landscapes using materials such as incense and kumkuma drawing a direct relationship between the labor practices of the incense industry and its treatment of women. Her works portrayed the condition of  the women which is often defined by the load of their work, mental barriers and sexual violation.

Notable exhibitions
Gowda's work has been exhibited in numerous solo exhibitions and festivals:

 Gallery 7, Mumbai (1989); 
 Gallery Chemould, Mumbai (1993); 
 GALLERYSKE, Bangalore (2004, 2008, 2011 and 2015); 
 Bose Pacia Gallery, New York (2006); 
 Museum Gouda, Netherlands (2008); 
 Office for Contemporary Art, Oslo (2010); 
 Iniva, London (2011); 
 Open Eye Policy, Van Abbemuseum, Eindhoven, Netherlands (2013); 
 Centre International D'Art and Du Paysage (2014); 
 Irish Museum of Modern Art, Dublin (2014); 
 Documenta 12 (2007); 
 Venice Biennale (2009); 
 Provisions, Sharjah Biennial (2009); 
 Garden of Learning, Busan Biennial (2012);
 IKON, Birmingham United Kingdom (2017);
 "Remains" Pirelli HangarBiococca, Milan Italy (2019)
 "Remains" BombasGens Centre D'Art, Valencia Spain (2019)
 Sheela Gowda. It.. Matters, Städtische Galerie im Lenbachhaus und Kunstbau, Munich (2020)

Notable group exhibitions include: 
 How Latitudes Become Form, Walker Art Center, Minneapolis (2003); 
 Indian Highway, Serpentine Gallery, London (2008); 
 Devi Art Foundation, New Delhi (2009); 
 Paris-Delhi-Bombay, Centre Pompidou, Paris (2011); 
 MAXXI - National Museum of the 21st Century Arts, Rome (2011); 
 Ullens Center for Contemporary Art, Beijing (2012); 
 Arken Museum, Copenhagen (2012); 
 Kiran Nadar Museum of Art, New Delhi (2013); 
 Museum Abteiberg, Monchengladbach (2014);
 Para Site, Hong Kong (2015).

Major collections
 Walker Art Centre, Minneapolis, USA
 Solomon R. Guggenheim Museum, USA

Sources
Vedrenne, Elisabeth Sheela Gowda en révolte. Rebellious Sheila Gowda.. Connaissance Des Arts, (724), 34. 6 March 2014

</ref>

</ref>

References

External links
Sheela Gowda at Archives of Women Artists, Research and Exhibitions

Sheela Gowda at Artsy.net
Sheela Gowda at 
Sheela Gowda at 
Sheela Gowda at Grove Art
Sheela Gowda, Frieze, 12 March 2009

1957 births
Living people
20th-century Indian painters
20th-century Indian sculptors
20th-century Indian women artists
21st-century Indian painters
21st-century Indian sculptors
21st-century Indian women artists
Alumni of the Royal College of Art
Artists from Bangalore
Feminist artists
Indian women painters
Indian women sculptors
Painters from Karnataka
People from Shimoga district
Women artists from Karnataka
Recipients of the Rajyotsava Award 2013